Caccavale is an Italian surname. Notable people with the surname include:

 (born 1963), Italian politician and journalist
Michele Caccavale (1947–2019), Italian politician
Sal Caccavale (born 1985), American soccer player and coach

Italian-language surnames